The Trouble with Cali is an American drama film directed by Paul Sorvino and written by his daughter Amanda Sorvino. It stars Laurence Leboeuf, Glynnis O'Connor, Raviv Ullman and RZA.

The film will not be released in theaters as a distribution deal was not able to be successfully negotiated spurring contention with Lackawanna County, Pennsylvania, residents as $500,000 in tax payer funds was used to finance the film. Subsequently, the Scranton Cultural Center hosted a free premiere of the film on July 9, 2015, with additional showings on July 10, 2015 and July 11, 2015.

Plot

Cast
 Laurence Leboeuf as Cali Bluejones
 Paul Sorvino as Ivan Bluejones
 Glynnis O'Connor as Avie Bluejones
 Chris Meyer as Vail Bosenthall
 Joanne Baron as Zelda Hirschorn
 Frank Adonis as Uncle Vito
 Annie Golden as Mrs. Katie Saperstein
 Mira Sorvino as The Ballet Master
 Raviv Ullman as Lois
 Peyton List as Young Cali Bluejones
 RZA as himself
 Bill Sorvino as Jimmy Lamberchin
 Michael Sorvino as Young Guido

References

External links
 

2012 films
2012 drama films
American drama films
2010s English-language films
2010s American films